Lebesby ( and ) is a municipality in Troms og Finnmark county, Norway. The administrative centre of the municipality is the village of Kjøllefjord. Other villages in the municipality include Ifjord, Kunes, Lebesby, and Veidnes.

The  municipality is the 8th largest by area out of the 356 municipalities in Norway. Lebesby is the 316th most populous municipality in Norway with a population of 1,221.

The municipality consists of the western half of the Nordkinn Peninsula, along with areas around the Laksefjorden. Most people live in the village of Kjøllefjord. This municipality is dominated by ethnic Norwegians, whereas the areas around the Laksefjorden are predominantly Sami. Fishing is the mainstay of the population.

The world's northernmost melkebruk (or small farm that produces milk), is in Bekkarfjord.

History
The parish of Lebesby was established as a municipality on 1 January 1838 (see formannskapsdistrikt law). In 1864, the eastern part of Lebesby that surrounds the Tanafjorden (population: 1,388) was separated to become the new municipality of Tana. Tana was later separated into Tana, Gamvik, and Berlevåg. The borders of Lebesby have remained unchanged since that time.

On 1 January 2020, the municipality became part of the newly formed Troms og Finnmark county. Previously, it had been part of the old Finnmark county.

Name
Lebesby is may be a Norwegianized form of a Northern Sami name Leaibbessiida. The first element is then derived from leaibi which means "alder" and the last element is siida which means "dwelling place". The other possible option is that Lebesby is a corruption of the Old Norse Liðvarðsbýr. That name is made up of Liðvarð, a man's name, and býr which also means "dwelling place".

Coat of arms
The coat of arms was granted on 22 July 1988. The official blazon is "Per fess embattled grady with three steps and two peaks Or and Sable". This means the arms have a field (background) that is divided by a line that is "embattled grady". A line embattled grady consists of series of two or three steps, as if each merlon has a smaller merlon atop it. The field below the line has a tincture of sable and the field above the line has a tincture of Or which means it is commonly colored yellow, but if it is made out of metal, then gold is used. The idea is that the arms represent the Finnkirka ("the Finn Church"), a cliff by the sea in the municipality. This cliff formation has the appearance of a church, and in former times was used by Sami people as a place of sacrifice. The arms were designed by Arvid Sveen.

Geography

The municipality consists of the areas around the Laksefjorden, including the eastern part of the Sværholt Peninsula and the western half of the Nordkinn Peninsula. At the entrance to the Kjøllefjorden at the northwestern tip of the Nordkinn Peninsula, one finds the spectacular Finnkirka sea cliff, so named because of its soaring spires that look like a church. On the other side of the Oksefjorden on the northern end of the peninsula, the Kinnarodden cape (shared with the municipality of Gamvik) is the northernmost point on the European mainland. There are several large lakes in the municipality including Kjæsvannet, Store Måsvannet, and Suolojávri.

Birdlife
The same seacliffs mentioned above hold large numbers of breeding seabirds. In fact Norway's third largest seabird colony can be found in the municipality. Experiencing a seabird colony is one of nature's great experiences, here you can see and listen to thousands of birds with such species as fulmar and Atlantic puffin being a part of a fascinating ecosystem.

Flora

Climate

Government
All municipalities in Norway, including Lebesby, are responsible for primary education (through 10th grade), outpatient health services, senior citizen services, unemployment and other social services, zoning, economic development, and municipal roads. The municipality is governed by a municipal council of elected representatives, which in turn elect a mayor.  The municipality falls under the Øst-Finnmark District Court and the Hålogaland Court of Appeal.

Municipal council
The municipal council  of Lebesby is made up of 17 representatives that are elected to four year terms. The party breakdown of the council is as follows:

Mayors
The mayors of Lebesby (incomplete list):
2019–present: Sigurd Rafaelsen (Ap) 
2010-2019: Stine Akselsen (Ap)

Culture

Churches
The Church of Norway has two parishes within the municipality of Lebesby. It is part of the Hammerfest prosti (deanery) in the Diocese of Nord-Hålogaland.

Notable people 
 Einar Wøhni (1920 in Lebesby – 1987) a Norwegian politician
 Gørild Mauseth (born 1972 in Kjøllefjord) a Norwegian actress

References

External links

Municipal fact sheet from Statistics Norway 
About Lebesby

 
Municipalities of Troms og Finnmark
Populated places of Arctic Norway
1838 establishments in Norway